The 2023 Hawthorn Football Club season will be the club's 99th season in the Australian Football League and 122nd overall, the 24th season playing home games at the Melbourne Cricket Ground, the 23rd season playing home games at the University of Tasmania Stadium and the 2nd season under head coach Sam Mitchell., and the 1st season with James Sicily as captain

Club summary 
The 2023 AFL season will be the 127th season of the VFL/AFL competition since its inception in 1897; having entered the competition in 1925, it will be the 99th season contested by the Hawthorn Football Club. Tasmania, iiNet, and Nissan are expected to continue as the club's three major sponsors, as they had done since 2006, 2013, and 2019 respectively, while ISC will replace Adidas as the clubs manufacturer of its on-and-off field apparel. Hawthorn will continue its alignment with the Box Hill Hawks Football Club in the Victorian Football League, allowing Hawthorn-listed players to play with the Box Hill Hawks when not selected in AFL matches.

Season summary 
22 December 2022 – Jai Newcombe signs a three-year deal to stay at Hawthorn until the end of 2026.

Playing list changes

Trades

Free agency

Additions

Draft

AFL draft

Rookie draft

Retirements and delistings

2023 player squad

Pre–season

Home & Away season

Ladder

Milestones
Round 1
 Cameron Mackenzie – AFL debut.
 Karl Amon – Hawthorn debut, 1st goal for Hawthorn.
 Fergus Greene – Hawthorn debut, 1st goal for Hawthorn.
 Lloyd Meek – Hawthorn debut.

References 

Hawthorn Football Club Season, 2023
Hawthorn Football Club seasons